The 2023 season will be the Pittsburgh Steelers' upcoming 91st season in the National Football League, their 2nd under general manager Omar Khan and their 17th under head coach Mike Tomlin. They will attempt to improve on their 9–8 record from last year, make the playoffs after a one-year absence, win their first AFC North title since 2020, and become the first team in AFC history to post 20 consecutive non-losing records.

Draft

Notes 
 Chicago traded their own second-round selection to Pittsburgh in exchange for wide receiver Chase Claypool.
 Pittsburgh traded their fifth-round selection to Seattle in exchange for cornerback Ahkello Witherspoon.
 Pittsburgh traded their sixth-round selection to Denver in exchange for linebacker Malik Reed and a seventh-round selection.

Staff

Current roster

Preseason
The Steelers' preseason opponents and schedule will be announced in the spring.

Regular season

2023 opponents
Listed below are the Steelers' opponents for 2023. Exact dates and times will be announced in the spring.

References

External links
 

Pittsburgh
Pittsburgh Steelers seasons
Pittsburgh Steelers
2020s in Pittsburgh